Prospero Caffarelli may refer to:

Prospero Caffarelli (died 1500), Italian bishop
Prospero Caffarelli (died 1659), Italian cardinal